Elachista anolba is a moth of the family Elachistidae. It is found in Australia in southern Tasmania.

The wingspan is 9.6-10.7 mm for males. The forewings are pale grey, but somewhat darker grey along the margins. The hindwings are grey.

References

Moths described in 2011
anolba
Moths of Australia
Taxa named by Lauri Kaila